The office of Superintendent of Public Works was created by an 1876 amendment to the New York State Constitution. It abolished the canal commissioners and established that the Department of Public Works execute all laws relating to canal maintenance and navigation except for those functions performed by the New York State Engineer and Surveyor who continued to prepare maps, plans and estimates for canal construction and improvement. The Canal Board (now consisting of the Superintendent of Public Works, the State Engineer and Surveyor, and the Commissioners of the Canal Fund) continued to handle hiring of employees and other personnel matters. The Barge Canal Law of 1903 (Chapter 147) directed the Canal Board to oversee the enlargement of and improvements to the Erie Canal, the Champlain Canal and the Oswego Canal. In 1967, the Department of Public Works was merged with other departments into the new New York State Department of Transportation.

List of Superintendents of Public Works
George B. McClellan (1826–1885) nominated March 16, 1877 by Gov. Robinson; rejected by the State Senate
Charles S. Fairchild nominated January 4, 1878 by Gov. Robinson; rejected by the State Senate on January 16, 1878 
Daniel Magone nominated January 18, 1878, by Gov. Robinson; rejected by State Senate January 23, 1878
Benjamin S. W. Clark (1829–1912) nominated January 23, confirmed January 30, 1878 - January 15, 1880 
Silas Belden Dutcher (1829–1889) January 15, 1880 - February 13, 1883 
James H. Shanahan (1828–1897), February 13, 1883 - resigned 1889 
Edward Hannan, December 16, 1889 - Jan 2, 1895
George W. Aldridge January 2, 1895 - Jan 16, 1899
John Nelson Partridge, January 16, 1899 - Dec 20, 1901
Charles S. Boyd, December 20, 1901 - January 4, 1905
Nicholas Van Vranken Franchot, January 4, 1905 - January 14, 1907
Frederick C. Stevens (New York politician), January 14, 1907 - January 4, 1911
Charles E. Treman, January 4, 1911 - January 1, 1913
Duncan W. Peck, January 1, 1913 - January 6, 1915
William Wallace Wotherspoon January 6, 1915 - February 3, 1919
Lewis Nixon, February 3, 1919 - May 3, 1919
Edward S. Walsh, May 3, 1919 - January 19, 1921
Charles L. Cadle, January 19, 1921 - January 9, 1923
Edward S. Walsh, January 9 - August 30, 1923
Frederick Stuart Greene (1870–1939), August 30, 1923 - March 26, 1939 (retired, but died before successor was appointed)
Arthur William Brandt (1888–1943), March 30, 1939  - May 20, 1943
Charles Harvey Sells (1889–1978), May 20, 1943  - September 30, 1948 (announced resignation on September 2 )
Bertram Dalley Tallamy (1901–1989)  September 30, 1948  - 1955
John W. Johnson (New York) 1955 - 1959
John Burch McMorran (1899–1991) 1959 - September 1, 1967, when he continued in office as the first head of the New York State Department of Transportation.

Notes

Public Works
History of New York (state)
 
1876 establishments in New York (state)
Government agencies established in 1876
1967 disestablishments in New York (state)
Government agencies disestablished in 1967